Herring are forage fish in the wild, mostly belonging to the family Clupeidae, but they are also an important food for humans. Herring often move in large schools around fishing banks and near the coast. The most abundant and commercially important species belong to the genus Clupea, found particularly in shallow, temperate waters of the North Pacific and North Atlantic Oceans, including the Baltic Sea, as well as off the west coast of South America. Three species of Clupea are recognized; the main taxon, the Atlantic herring, accounts for over half the world's commercial capture of herrings.

Herrings played a pivotal role in the history of marine fisheries in Europe, and early in the twentieth century, their study was fundamental to the evolution of fisheries science. These oily fish also have a long history as an important food fish, and are often salted, smoked, or pickled.


Nutrition 

Raw Atlantic herring is 72% water, 18% protein, 9% fat, and contains no carbohydrates. In a 100 gram reference amount, raw herring provides 158 calories, and is a highly rich source (20% or more of the Daily Value, DV) of vitamin B12 (570% DV). It also has rich content of niacin, vitamin B6, vitamin D, and phosphorus (21-34% DV). Raw herring contains moderate amounts of other B vitamins and zinc, and is an excellent food source of omega-3 fatty acids.

Contamination

Pacific and Atlantic herring are susceptible to contamination from environmental pollution, such as by PCBs, PBDEs, mercury, and listeria. There is a (rare) risk of harmful bacteria from eating raw herring eggs.

Preparation
Herring has been a staple food source since at least 3000 B.C. There are numerous ways the fish is served and many regional recipes: eaten raw, fermented, pickled, or cured by other techniques.

Raw 
A typical Dutch delicacy is Hollandse Nieuwe (Dutch New), which is raw herring from the catches around the end of spring and the beginning of summer. This is typically eaten with raw onion. Hollandse nieuwe is only available in spring when the first seasonal catch of herring is brought in.  This is celebrated in festivals such as the Vlaardingen Herring Festival and Vlaggetjesdag in Scheveningen. The new herring are frozen and enzyme-preserved for the remainder of the year. The herring is said to be eaten "raw" because it has not been cooked, although it has been subjected to a degree of curing. The first barrel of Hollandse Nieuwe is traditionally sold at auction for charity. Very young herring are called 
whitebait and are eaten whole as a delicacy.

Salted 
In Norway, salting herring is a significant business. Herring was traditionally salted in wooden barrels and constituted a significant food resource. Salted herring is the basis for a number of herring dishes, as spekesild.

Fermented 
In Sweden, Baltic herring ("Strömming") is fermented to make surströmming.

Pickled 
Pickled herrings are part of German (Bismarckhering), Nordic, British, Canadian, Dutch, Polish, Baltic and Jewish cuisine. Most herring cures use a two-step process. Initially, the herrings are cured with salt to extract water. The second stage involves removing the salt and adding flavorings, typically a vinegar, salt, and sugar solution to which ingredients like peppercorn, bay leaves and raw onions are added. Other flavors can be added, such as sherry, mustard and dill. The tradition is strong in Scandinavia, the Netherlands, Iceland and Germany.

Dried 
In the Philippines, dried herring is popularly eaten during breakfast, along with garlic rice and eggs.

Smoked 
A kipper is a split, gutted and cold-smoked herring, a bloater is a whole non-gutted cold smoked herring, and a buckling is a whole herring, gutted apart from roe or milt and then hot-smoked. All are staples of British cuisine. According to George Orwell in The Road to Wigan Pier, Emperor Charles V erected a statue to the inventor of bloaters.

Smoked herring is a traditional meal on Bornholm. This is also the case in Sweden, where one can get hard-fried/smoked strömming, known as sotare, in places like Skansen, Stockholm.

Other 
In Scotland, herrings are traditionally filleted, coated in seasoned pin-head oatmeal, and fried in a pan with butter or oil. This dish is usually served with "crushed", buttered, and boiled potatoes.

In Sweden, herring soup is a traditional dish.

In Southeast Alaska, western hemlock boughs are cut and placed in the ocean before the herring arrive to spawn. The fertilized herring eggs stick to the boughs, and are easily collected. After being boiled briefly the eggs are removed from the bough. Herring eggs collected in this way are eaten plain or in herring egg salad. This method of collection is part of Tlingit tradition.

Foods and dishes

See also

 List of smoked foods
 Skåne Market
Sardines as food
Anchovies as food

Notes

References 

 
 O'Clair, Rita M. and O'Clair, Charles E., "Pacific herring," Southeast Alaska's Rocky Shores: Animals. pg. 343-346. Plant Press: Auke Bay, Alaska (1998).

External links

 Nutrition Facts for Herring
 In praise of the humble herring The Independent, 1 September 2005.
 En route: Scandinavia; Herring, the Fish That Roared New York Times, 30 October 2002.

Fish as food
 
Seafood
Commercial fish
Oily fish
Smoked fish